The Dharmaguptaka (Sanskrit: धर्मगुप्तक) are one of the eighteen or twenty early Buddhist schools, depending on the source. They are said to have originated from another sect, the Mahīśāsakas. The Dharmaguptakas had a prominent role in early Central Asian and Chinese Buddhism, and their Prātimokṣa (monastic rules for bhikṣus and bhikṣuṇīs) are still in effect in East Asian countries to this day, including China, Vietnam, Korea, and Japan as well as the Philippines. They are one of three surviving Vinaya lineages, along with that of the Theravāda and the Mūlasarvāstivāda.

Etymology
Guptaka means "preserver" and dharma "law, justice, morality", and, most likely, the set of laws of Northern Buddhism.

Doctrinal development

Overview
The Dharmaguptakas regarded the path of a śrāvaka (śrāvakayāna) and the path of a bodhisattva (bodhisattvayāna) to be separate. A translation and commentary on the Samayabhedoparacanacakra reads:

According to the Abhidharma Mahāvibhāṣā Śāstra, the Dharmaguptakas held that the Four Noble Truths are to be observed simultaneously.

Vasubandhu states that the Dharmaguptakas held, in agreement with Theravada and against Sarvāstivāda, that realization of the four noble truths happens all at once (ekābhisamaya).

The Dharmaguptaka are known to have rejected the authority of the Sarvāstivāda prātimokṣa rules on the grounds that the original teachings of the Buddha had been lost.

Twelve aṅgas
The Dharmaguptaka used a twelvefold division of the Buddhist teachings, which has been found in their Dīrgha Āgama, their Vinaya, and in some Mahāyāna sūtras. These twelve divisions are: sūtra, geya, vyākaraṇa, gāthā, udāna, nidāna, jātaka, itivṛttaka, vaipulya, adbhūtadharma, avadāna, and upadeśa.

Appearance and language

Robes
Between 148 and 170 CE, the Parthian monk An Shigao came to China and translated a work which described the color of monastic robes (Skt. kāṣāya) utilized in five major Indian Buddhist sects, called Da Biqiu Sanqian Weiyi. Another text translated at a later date, the Śāriputraparipṛcchā, contains a very similar passage with nearly the same information. However, the colors for Dharmaguptaka and Sarvāstivāda are reversed. In the earlier source, the Sarvāstivāda are described as wearing deep red robes, while the Dharmaguptaka are described as wearing black robes. The corresponding passage found in the later Śāriputraparipṛcchā, in contrast, portrays the Sarvāstivāda as wearing black robes and the Dharmaguptaka as wearing deep red robes.

During the Tang dynasty, Chinese Buddhist monastics typically wore grayish-black robes and were even colloquially referred to as Zīyī, "those of the black robes." However, the Song dynasty monk Zanning (919–1001 CE) writes that during the earlier Han-Wei period, the Chinese monks typically wore red robes.

According to the Dharmaguptaka vinaya, the robes of monastics should be sewn out of no more than 18 pieces of cloth, and the cloth should be fairly heavy and coarse.

Language
A consensus has grown in scholarship which sees the first wave of Buddhist missionary work as associated with the Gāndhārī language and the Kharoṣṭhī script and tentatively with the Dharmaguptaka sect. However, there is evidence that other sects and traditions of Buddhism also used Gāndhārī, and further evidence that the Dharmaguptaka sect also used Sanskrit at times:

Starting in the first century of the Common Era, there was a large trend toward a type of Gāndhārī which was heavily Sanskritized.

History

In Northwest India

The Gandharan Buddhist texts, the earliest Buddhist texts ever discovered, are apparently dedicated to the teachers of the Dharmaguptaka school. They tend to confirm a flourishing of the Dharmaguptaka school in northwestern India around the 1st century CE, with Gāndhārī as the canonical language, and this would explain the subsequent influence of the Dharmaguptakas in Central Asia and then northeastern Asia. According to Buddhist scholar A. K. Warder, the Dharmaguptaka originated in Aparānta.

According to one scholar, the evidence afforded by the Gandharan Buddhist texts "suggest[s] that the Dharmaguptaka sect achieved early success under their Indo-Scythian supporters in Gandhāra, but that the sect subsequently declined with the rise of the Kuṣāṇa Empire (ca. mid-first to third century A.D.), which gave its patronage to the Sarvāstivāda sect."

In Central Asia
Available evidence indicates that the first Buddhist missions to Khotan were carried out by the Dharmaguptaka sect:

A number of scholars have identified three distinct major phases of missionary activities seen in the history of Buddhism in Central Asia, which are associated with the following sects, chronologically:
 Dharmagupta
 Sarvāstivāda
 Mūlasarvāstivāda

In the 7th century CE, Xuanzang and Yijing both recorded that the Dharmaguptakas were located in Oḍḍiyāna and Central Asia, but not in the Indian subcontinent. Yijing grouped the Mahīśāsaka, Dharmaguptaka, and Kāśyapīya together as sub-sects of the Sarvāstivāda, and stated that these three were not prevalent in the "five parts of India," but were located in the some parts of Oḍḍiyāna, Khotan, and Kucha.

In East Asia

The Dharmaguptakas made more efforts than any other sect to spread Buddhism outside India, to areas such as Iran, Central Asia, and China, and they had great success in doing so. Therefore, most countries which adopted Buddhism from China, also adopted the Dharmaguptaka vinaya and ordination lineage for bhikṣus and bhikṣuṇīs. According to A. K. Warder, in some ways the Dharmaguptaka sect can be considered to have survived to the present in those East Asian countries. Warder further writes:

During the early period of Chinese Buddhism, the Indian Buddhist sects recognized as important, and whose texts were studied, were the Dharmaguptakas, Mahīśāsakas, Kāśyapīyas, Sarvāstivādins, and the Mahāsāṃghikas.

Between 250 and 255 CE, the Dharmaguptaka ordination lineage was established in China when Indian monks were invited to help with ordination in China. No full Vinaya had been translated at this time, and only two texts were available: the Dharmaguptaka Karmavācanā for ordination, and the Mahāsāṃghika Prātimokṣa for regulating the life of monks. After the translation of full Vinayas, the Dharmaguptaka ordination lineage was followed by most monks, but temples often regulated monastic life with other Vinaya texts, such as those of the Mahāsāṃghika, the Mahīśāsaka, or the Sarvāstivāda.

In the 7th century, Yijing wrote that in eastern China, most people followed the Dharmaguptaka Vinaya, while the Mahāsāṃghika Vinaya was used in earlier times in Guanzhong (the region around Chang'an), and that the Sarvāstivāda Vinaya was prominent in the Yangtze area and further south. In the 7th century, the existence of multiple Vinaya lineages throughout China was criticized by prominent Vinaya masters such as Yijing and Dao An (654–717). In the early 8th century, Dao An gained the support of Emperor Zhongzong of Tang and an imperial edict was issued that the sangha in China should use only the Dharmaguptaka vinaya for ordination.

Texts

Gandhāran Buddhist texts
The Gandhāran Buddhist texts (the oldest extant Buddhist manuscripts) are attributed to the Dharmaguptaka sect by Richard Salomon, the leading scholar in the field, and the British Library scrolls "represent a random but reasonably representative fraction of what was probably a much larger set of texts preserved in the library of a monastery of the Dharmaguptaka sect in Nagarāhāra."

Among the Dharmaguptaka Gandhāran Buddhist texts in the Schøyen Collection, is a fragment in the Kharoṣṭhī script referencing the Six Pāramitās, a central practice for bodhisattvas in Mahāyāna doctrine.

Vinaya translation
In the early 5th century CE, Dharmaguptaka Vinaya was translated into Chinese by the Dharmaguptaka monk Buddhayaśas (佛陀耶舍) of Kashmir. For this translation, Buddhayaśas recited the Dharmaguptaka Vinaya entirely from memory, rather than reading it from a written manuscript. After its translation, the Dharmaguptaka Vinaya became the predominant vinaya in Chinese Buddhist monasticism. The Dharmaguptaka Vinaya, or monastic rules, are still followed today in China, Vietnam and Korea, and its lineage for the ordination of monks and nuns has survived uninterrupted to this day. The name of the Dharmaguptaka Vinaya in the East Asian tradition is the "Vinaya in Four Parts", and the equivalent Sanskrit title would be Caturvargika Vinaya. Ordination under the Dharmaguptaka Vinaya only relates to monastic vows and lineage (Vinaya), and does not conflict with the actual Buddhist teachings that one follows (Dharma).

Āgama collections
The Dīrgha Āgama ("Long Discourses," 長阿含經 Cháng Āhán Jīng) (T. 1) corresponds to the Dīgha Nikāya of the Theravada school.  A complete version of the Dīrgha Āgama of the Dharmaguptaka sect was translated by Buddhayaśas and Zhu Fonian (竺佛念) in the Later Qin dynasty, dated to 413 CE. It contains 30 sūtras in contrast to the 34 suttas of the Theravadin Dīgha Nikāya.

The Ekottara Āgama ("Incremental Discourses," 增壹阿含經 Zēngyī Āhán Jīng) (T. 125) corresponds to the Anguttara Nikāya of the Theravāda school. It was translated into Chinese by Dharmanandi in 384 CE, and edited by Gautama Saṃghadeva in 398 CE. Some have proposed that the original text for this translation came from the Sarvāstivādins or the Mahāsāṃghikas. However, according to A.K. Warder, the Ekottara Āgama references 250 prātimokṣa rules for monks, which agrees only with the Dharmaguptaka Vinaya. He also views some of the doctrine as contradicting tenets of the Mahāsāṃghika school, and states that they agree with Dharmaguptaka views currently known. He therefore concludes that the extant Ekottara Āgama is that of the Dharmaguptakas.

Abhidharma
The Śāriputra Abhidharma Śāstra (舍利弗阿毘曇論 Shèlìfú Āpítán Lùn) (T. 1548) is a complete abhidharma text that is thought to come from the Dharmaguptaka sect. The only complete edition of this text is in Chinese. Sanskrit fragments have been found in Bamiyan, Afghanistan, and are now part of the Schøyen Collection (MS 2375/08). These manuscripts are thought to have been part of a monastery library of the Mahāsāṃghika Lokottaravāda sect.

Additional piṭakas
The Dharmaguptaka Tripiṭaka is said to have contained two extra sections that were not included by some other schools. These included a Bodhisattva Piṭaka and a Mantra Piṭaka ( Zhòu Zàng), also sometimes called a Dhāraṇī Piṭaka. According to the fifth-century Dharmaguptaka monk Buddhayaśas, the translator of the Dharmaguptaka Vinaya into Chinese, the Dharmaguptaka school had assimilated the "Mahāyāna Tripiṭaka" ( Dàchéng Sānzàng).

Abhiniṣkramaṇa Sūtra

The Dharmaguptaka biography of the Buddha is the most exhaustive of all classical biographies of the Buddha, and is entitled Abhiniṣkramaṇa Sūtra. Various Chinese translations of this text date from between the 3rd and 6th century CE.

Relationship to Mahāyāna

Kushan era
It is unknown when some members of the Dharmaguptaka school began to accept the Mahāyāna sūtras, but the Mañjuśrīmūlakalpa records that Kaniṣka (127-151 CE) of the Kuṣāṇa Empire presided over the establishment of Prajñāpāramitā doctrines in the northwest of India. Tāranātha wrote that in this region, 500 bodhisattvas attended the council at Jālandhra monastery during the time of Kaniṣka, suggesting some institutional strength for Mahāyāna in the northwest during this period. Edward Conze goes further to say that Prajñāpāramitā had great success in the northwest during the Kuṣāṇa period, and may have been the "fortress and hearth" of early Mahāyāna, but not its origin, which he associates with the Mahāsāṃghika branch.

Ugraparipṛcchā Sūtra
Jan Nattier writes that available textual evidence suggests that the Mahāyāna Ugraparipṛcchā Sūtra circulated in Dharmaguptaka communities during its early history, but a later translation shows evidence that the text later circulated amongst the Sarvāstivādins as well. The Ugraparipṛcchā also mentions a fourfold division of the Buddhist canon which includes a Bodhisattva Piṭaka, and the Dharmaguptaka are known to have had such a collection in their canon. Nattier further describes the type of community depicted in the Ugraparipṛcchā:

Ratnarāśivyākaraṇa Sūtra
The Mahāyāna Ratnarāśivyākaraṇa Sūtra, which is part of the Mahāratnakūṭa Sūtra, is believed by some scholars to have a Dharmaguptaka origin or background, due to its specific regulations regarding giving to the Buddha and giving to the Saṃgha.

Prajñāpāramitā sūtras
According to Joseph Walser, there is evidence that the Pañcaviṃśatisāhasrikā Prajñāpāramitā Sūtra (25,000 lines) and the Śatasāhasrikā Prajñāpāramitā Sūtra (100,000 lines) have a connection with the Dharmaguptaka sect, while the Aṣṭasāhasrikā Prajñāpāramitā Sūtra (8000 lines) does not. Instead, Guang Xing assesses the view of the Buddha given in the Aṣṭasāhasrikā Prajñāpāramitā Sūtra (8000 lines) as being that of the Mahāsāṃghikas.

Buddhayaśas
The translator Buddhayaśas was a Dharmaguptaka monk who was known to be a Mahāyānist, and he is recorded as having learned both Hīnayāna and Mahāyāna treatises. He translated the Dharmaguptaka Vinaya, the Dīrgha Āgama, and Mahāyāna texts including the Ākāśagarbha Bodhisattva Sūtra (虛空藏菩薩經 Xūkōngzàng Púsà Jīng). The preface written by Buddhayaśas for his translation of the Dharmaguptaka Vinaya states that the Dharmaguptakas had assimilated the Mahāyāna Tripiṭaka.

Buddhist canon
The Dharmaguptakas were said to have had two extra sections in their canon:

 Bodhisattva Piṭaka
 Mantra Piṭaka or Dhāraṇī Piṭaka

In the 4th century Mahāyāna abhidharma work Abhidharmasamuccaya, Asaṅga refers to the collection which contains the Āgamas as the Śrāvakapiṭaka, and associates it with the śrāvakas and pratyekabuddhas. Asaṅga classifies the Mahāyāna sūtras as belonging to the Bodhisattvapiṭaka, which is designated as the collection of teachings for bodhisattvas.

Paramārtha
Paramārtha, a 6th-century CE Indian monk from Ujjain, unequivocally associates the Dharmaguptaka school with the Mahāyāna, and portrays the Dharmaguptakas as being perhaps the closest to a straightforward Mahāyāna sect.

See also
 Buddhism in Central Asia
 Schools of Buddhism
 Silk Road transmission of Buddhism

Notes

References
 Foltz, Richard, Religions of the Silk Road, Palgrave Macmillan, 2nd edition, 2010 
 
 
 Heirman, Ann (2002). Can We Trace the Early Dharmaguptakas?, T'oung Pao, Second Series 88 (4/5), 396-429 
Indian royal advisors

External links
 The Gandharan texts and the Dharmaguptaka

Nikaya schools
Sthaviravāda
Buddhism in China
Buddhism in Japan
Buddhism in Korea
Buddhism in the Philippines
Buddhism in Vietnam
Gandhara
History of Central Asia
Religion in Central Asia
Silk Road
Vinaya
Early Buddhist schools